3C 438 is a Seyfert galaxy located in the constellation Cygnus.

References

External links
 3CRR Atlas:3C 438: Main Page

Cygnus (constellation)
Seyfert galaxies
438
2817736
37.63